Nokkukuthi is a 1983 Indian Malayalam film, directed by Mankada Ravi Varma and produced by P. P. Kunjahammad. The film stars Ajitha Gopalakrishnan, K. V. Haridas, Sameera and Sethu in lead roles.

Cast
Ajitha Gopalakrishnan
K. V. Haridas
Sethu
Kadammanitta Ramakrishnan

References

External links
 

1983 films
1980s Malayalam-language films